Any Time Now is a live album by O.A.R. released on May 6, 2002.  The album was recorded at the 9:30 Club in Washington D.C. on November 23 & November 24, 2001.  The album debuted on the Billboard Charts Independent Albums: #11 and Top Heatseekers: #4.  It also debuted on the Billboard 200 in the 156th position.  There is a hidden track titled "Short a Try" at the end of the last song on the first disc (within Delicate Few).  Junior Marvin of The Wailers Band is featured on the cover of Bob Marley's song "Stir It Up."  In 2006 the album was certified gold by the RIAA.

Track listing

Disc one
 "City on Down" - 8:11
 "Get Away" - 6:37
 "Destination" - 6:37
 "Conquering Fools" - 4:55
 "About an Hour Ago" - 7:31
 "Black Rock" - 6:45
 "On Top the Cage" - 5:36
 "She Gone" - 5:56
 "Delicate Few"(Followed by hidden track, "Short a Try") - 13:33

Disc two
 "The Wanderer" - 6:27
 "Hey Girl" - 8:13
 "Anyway" - 6:36
 "Hold on True" - 3:36
 "Night Shift...Stir It Up" - 11:27
 "About Mr. Brown" - 6:39
 "That Was a Crazy Game of Poker" - 12:51
 "I Feel Home" - 7:17

Chart positions

References

O.A.R. albums
2002 live albums